Călacea may refer to the following places in Romania:

 Călacea, a village in Olcea Commune, Bihor County
 Călacea, a village in Gârbou Commune, Sălaj County
 Călacea, a village in Orțișoara Commune, Timiș County